Butyrskaya is a Moscow Metro station of Lyublinsko-Dmitrovskaya Line. It is located between Maryina Roshcha and Fonvizinskaya, at the intersection of Rustaveli Street and Ogorodny Proyezd, close to Ostankino railway station. It has one island platform. The name of the station derives from Butyrsky District and is thus related to the Butyrka prison and Butyrskaya Street.

The extension of the line from Maryina Roshcha northwest to Petrovsko-Razumovskaya via Butyrskaya and Fonvizinskaya was originally planned to be opened in December 2015. The projected opening date was later shifted to 2016. The station was opened on 16 September 2016.

References

Moscow Metro stations
Railway stations in Russia opened in 2016
Lyublinsko-Dmitrovskaya Line
Railway stations located underground in Russia